Suchitra Bandekar (Marathi: सुचित्रा बांदेकर) is an Indian actress. She mainly works in Hindi and Marathi films and television.

Childhood 
She was born and brought up in Nashik, Maharashtra. She attended school in Balmohan Vidya Mandir and college in D. G. Ruparel College, Dadar.

Personal life 
Suchitra got married with her long time boyfriend Aadesh Bandekar in 1990. She has a son, named Soham Bandekar.

Filmography

Television

Actor

Producer 
 Lakshya on Star Pravah
 Nanda Saukhya Bhare on Zee Marathi
 Tharala Tar Mag on Star Pravah
 Lalit 205 on Star Pravah
 Almost Sufal Sampurna on Zee Yuva
 Nave Lakshya on Star Pravah
 Shabbas Sunbai on Sun Marathi

References

External links
 Suchitra Bandekar on IMDb

Living people
Indian television actresses
Actresses in Marathi television
Actresses in Marathi cinema
1972 births